This table lists the official (not de facto) appointment and end dates of the headmasters of Colchester Royal Grammar School, 1530 to present. Until the New Scheme of 1899, all headmasters had to be in holy orders; most were local clergy. (Res. signifies resigned.)

Sources
 

Colchester Royal Grammar School

Essex-related lists